A Closer Look may refer to:

A Closer Look (Babyface album), 1991
A Closer Look (Steve Harley & Cockney Rebel album), 1975
A Closer Look, a recurring current events and news commentary segment on American late-night show Late Night with Seth Meyers
A Closer Look, an upcoming TV series that will premiere on November 5, 2020, on UMC

See also
 Look Closer (disambiguation)